George Bekefi (14 March 1925 in Prague – 17 August 1995 in Brookline, Massachusetts) was a plasma physicist, a professor at MIT, and an inventor.

In 1939 Bekefi emigrated from Czechoslovakia to England by means of a British government program to help Jewish children. He received in 1948 a B.S. in science and mathematics from University College London. In 1948 he went to Montreal as an instructor in the physics department of McGill University, where he earned an M.S. in 1950 and a Ph.D. in 1952. At McGill he became a research associate and then an assistant professor, leaving in 1957 to join MIT's Plasma Physics Group in the Research Laboratory of Electronics. Bekefi remained at MIT for the remainder of his career. In MIT's physics department he became in 1961 an assistant professor, in 1964 an associate professor, and in 1967 a full professor, retiring in the summer of 1995 as professor emeritus.

(NOTE: The preceding quotation from the New York Times obituary should have "author or co-author" instead of "co-author" because Bekefi was the sole author of Radiation Processes in Plasmas.)

Bekefi guided about 50 graduate students to their M.S. and Ph.D. degrees. Upon his death from leukemia, he was survived by a wife, a son, and a daughter.

Awards and honors
Guggenheim Fellow for the academic year 1972–1973 (spent at the University of Paris and the Hebrew University in Jerusalem)
Fellow of the American Physical Society and chairman of the Society's Division of Plasma Physics in 1978
Institute of Electrical and Electronics Engineers' Plasma Science and Applications Prize in 1989
Gold Honorary Medal for Merit in the field of Physics Sciences from the Academy of Sciences of the Czech Republic in 1993 
Free-Electron Laser Award by the American Physical Society in 1995

Selected publications

as editor and co-author: 
 with A. H. Barrett:

References

1925 births
1995 deaths
American people of Czech-Jewish descent
20th-century American physicists
Alumni of University College London
Academic staff of McGill University
Massachusetts Institute of Technology School of Science faculty
Fellows of the American Physical Society